The 2018–19 Basketball Champions League was the third season of the Basketball Champions League (BCL), a European-wide professional basketball competition for clubs, that was launched by FIBA. The competition began in September 2018, with the qualifying rounds, and concluded in May 2019. It featured 19 domestic champions including two from France and Italy. 

The Final Four was held in the Sportpaleis in Antwerp on 3 and 5 May 2019.

Virtus Bologna won its first BCL championship. As such, the team qualified for the 2020 FIBA Intercontinental Cup.

Eligibility of players
In 2017, FIBA agreed to adopt eligibility rules, forcing the clubs to have at least 5 home-grown players in rosters of 11 or 12 players, or at least four, if the team has got fewer players.

Team allocation
A total of 56 teams (19 of which are champions) from 28 countries will participate in the 2018–19 Basketball Champions League. On July 11, 2018, Kalev/Cramo was replaced by Z-Mobile Prishtina. On July 12, 2018, Eskişehir announced their withdrawal from the competition, leaving an open spot in group C that would be occupied by Lietkabelis.

Teams
League positions after eventual playoffs of the previous season shown in parentheses (TH: Champions League title holders; FEC: FIBA Europe Cup title holders).

Round and draw dates
The schedule of the competition is as follows (all draws are held at the FIBA headquarters in Mies, Switzerland, unless stated otherwise):

Qualifying rounds
The first qualifying rounds were held on 20–21 September and 22–24 September 2018. The second round was held on 25–26 September and 27–29 September 2018. The third round was played on 30 September and 2 October 2018. The losers of all the rounds entered the 2018–19 FIBA Europe Cup regular season.

Draw
The 24 teams that entered in the first round were divided into four pots. Teams of pot A would play against teams from pot D in games 1 to 6, and pot B teams will face the ones of the pot C. Teams from pots A and B would play the second leg at home.

In the second round, teams from games 7 to 12 would play the first leg at home.

First qualifying round
A total of 24 teams will play in the first qualifying round. The first legs were played on 20 and 21 September, while the second legs were played on 22 and 24 September 2018.

|}

Second qualifying round
The twelve winners of the first qualifying round will play the second round. The first legs were played on 25 and 26 September, while the second legs were played on 27 and 29 September 2018.

After the retirement of Eskişehir, the winner of the series between Red October Cantù and Telenet Giants Antwerp joined directly the regular season.

|}

Third qualifying round
After the retirement of Eskişehir, a total of 10 teams will play in the third qualifying round: five teams which enter in this round, and five of the six winners of the second qualifying round. Winners of game 13 will directly qualify to the regular season without playing this round. The first legs were played on 1 October, while the second legs were played on 4 October 2018.

|}

Regular season

The 32 teams are drawn into four groups of eight, with the restriction that teams from the same country cannot be drawn against each other. In each group, teams play against each other home-and-away, in a round-robin format. The group winners, runners-up, third-placed teams and fourth-placed teams, advance to the round of 16, while the fifth-placed teams and sixth-placed teams enter the 2018–19 FIBA Europe Cup playoffs.

A total of 32 teams play in the regular season: 26 teams which enter in this stage, and the 6 winners of the third qualifying round. The regular season will start on 9 October 2018 and end 6 February 2019.

Draw
Teams were divided into two pots according to the club ranking published by the organization. Twelve teams were named seeded teams while the rest would be unseeded teams.

Group A

Group B

Group C

Group D

Playoffs

The playoffs start on 5 March 2019 and end 3 April 2019.

In the playoffs, teams play against each other over two legs on a home-and-away basis, except for the Final Four. In the playoffs draw, the group winners and the runners-up are seeded, and the third-placed teams and the fourth-placed teams are unseeded. The seeded teams are drawn against the unseeded teams, with the seeded teams hosting the second leg. Teams from the same group cannot be drawn against each other.

Bracket

Round of 16
The first legs were played on 6–7 March, and the second legs on 13–14 March 2019.

Quarterfinals
The first legs were played on 27–28 March, and the second legs were played on 3–4 April 2019.

Final Four

The concluding Final Four tournament will be played on 3–5 May 2019. The drawing of the pairings took place on 10 April 2019. On 5 April, the Sportpaleis in Antwerp, Belgium was announced as the venue of the 2019 Final Four.

Awards

Most Valuable Player

Final Four MVP

Star Lineup

Best Young Player

Best Coach

Game Day MVP

After each gameday a selection of five players with the highest efficiency ratings is made by the Basketball Champions League. Afterwards, the official website decides which player is crowned Game Day MVP.

Regular season

Round of 16

Quarterfinals

Prize money
Based on final position, teams received prize money from the BCL.

Sponsorship

See also
2018–19 EuroLeague
2018–19 EuroCup Basketball
2018–19 FIBA Europe Cup

References

External links
Basketball Champions League (official website)
FIBA (official website)

 
Basketball Champions League